Ronald Terowie Stewart (12 January 1904 – 15 December 1982) was a New Zealand rugby union player. He played 39 matches for the All Blacks including five internationals. He was one of the selectors of the 2nd New Zealand Expeditionary Force rugby team, known as the "Kiwis", following the end of World War II, and was a  selector in 1950.

References

1904 births
1982 deaths
People from Waikaia
People educated at Timaru Boys' High School
New Zealand rugby union players
New Zealand international rugby union players
South Canterbury rugby union players
Canterbury rugby union players
Rugby union flankers
New Zealand sports executives and administrators
Rugby union players from Southland, New Zealand